Wesley Koolhof and Matwé Middelkoop were the defending champions, but they lost in first round to Ken and Neal Skupski.

Viktor Troicki and Nenad Zimonjić won the title, defeating Mikhail Elgin and Andrey Kuznetsov in the final, 6–4, 6–4.

Seeds

Draw

Draw

References
 Main Draw

Sofia Open
Sofia Open